1989 in the Philippines details events of note that happened in the Philippines in the year 1989.

Incumbents

 President: Corazon Aquino (PDP-Laban)
 Vice President: Salvador Laurel (UNIDO)
 Senate President: Jovito Salonga
 House Speaker: Ramon Mitra, Jr.
 Chief Justice: Marcelo Fernan
 Philippine Congress: 8th Congress of the Philippines

Events

January
 January 5–7 – Eight mutinous policemen led by Pat. Rizal Alih take hostage Philippine Constabulary regional commander Brig. Gen. Eduardo Batalla, his aide, Col. Romeo Abendan, and five others in Camp Cawa-Cawa, Zamboanga City. The siege ends, Jan. 7, in an assault by government forces, destroying buildings in the PC Regional Command headquarters and leaving a general, colonel and 14 renegades dead. Alih escapes; would be arrested in Malaysia in 1994, extradited in 2006, and detained until his death in 2015.

March
 March 31 – The famous alleged Marian apparition in the town of Agoo, La Union to Judiel Nieva, a teenager who later become a transgender took place. It was said that the Blessed Virgin appeared on a guava tree, delivering messages and prophecies to Judiel. It became a highly sensational event for many Filipino Catholics as millions of pilgrims came to Agoo to see the phenomena like the "sun dancing", a statue of the Virgin Mary crying tears of blood, etc. The events in Agoo drawn attention to the Philippine Church hierarchy even to Rome, who conducted a thorough investigation on the events. In the year 1993, the events of Agoo apparitions are declared "non constat de supernaturalitate" (condemned) by the Catholic Bishops Conference of the Philippines and the judgment of the late Bishop Salvador L. Lazo of San Fernando diocese who was the Ordinary of the said diocese during the phenomena.
 March 28 – Elections were held in the country's 42,000 barangays.

April
 April 21 – U.S. Army Col. James Rowe is assassinated by the Communists in Quezon City; incident prompts the issue of removal of the U.S. military bases from the country. In 1991, the city Regional Trial Court would convict Donato Continente and Juanito Itaas in connection to the incident that also wounds the soldier's driver.

May
 May 30 – A mining community in Mount Diwata, Monkayo, then part of Davao del Norte, collapses from heavy rain, resulting in the deaths of thousands, mostly miners, in what would be the worst disaster in the area.

June
 June 30 – University of the Philippines President Jose V. Abueva and Defense Secretary Fidel V. Ramos signs the UP–DND accord that sets out a guideline for law enforcers in conducting their operations inside the university.

July
 July 13 – A military tribunal acquits 23 soldiers who are charged with murder regarding the deaths of 17 civilians in a military encounter in Lupao, Nueva Ecija in 1987, asserting before that those slain were communist guerrillas.
 July 17 – DZBB established as the first AM radio station and is known as "Bisig Bayan".

August
 August 1 – The Autonomous Region in Muslim Mindanao is created through Republic Act No. 6734 also known as the Organic Act.
 August 13–15 – A hostage crisis at the Davao Metropolitan District Command Center (Davao Metrodiscom) occurs, perpetrated by the group of inmates led by Felipe Pugoy and Mohammad Nazir Samparani which resulted to the death of five hostages and all 16 inmates.

September
 September 20 – Lea Salonga begins her performance in Miss Saigon musical in London for leading role as Kim.
 September 28 – Former President Ferdinand Marcos dies in an inter-organ failure at his hospital in Honolulu, Hawaii.

October
 October 1–13 – Typhoons Angela (Rubing), Dan (Saling), and Elsie (Tasing) impact the country in two weeks.

November
 November 19 – A plebiscite is held in the ARMM, resulting in the ratification of RA 6734 that established the region, with the inclusion of the provinces of Lanao del Sur (except Marawi City), Maguindanao, Sulu and Tawi-Tawi.

December
 December 1–9 – A coup d'etat against the government of Philippine President Corazon Aquino is staged by members of the Armed Forces of the Philippines belonging to the Reform the Armed Forces Movement (RAM) and soldiers loyal to former President Ferdinand Marcos led by Colonel Gregorio Honasan, General Edgardo Abenina, and retired General Jose Ma. Zumel.

Holidays

As per Executive Order No. 292, chapter 7 section 26, the following are regular holidays and special days, approved on July 25, 1987. Note that in the list, holidays in bold are "regular holidays" and those in italics are "nationwide special days".

 January 1 – New Year's Day
 March 23 – Maundy Thursday
 March 24 – Good Friday
 April 9 – Araw ng Kagitingan (Bataan and Corregidor Day) 
 May 1 – Labor Day
 June 12 – Independence Day 
 August 27 – National Heroes Day
 November 1 –  All Saints Day
 November 30 – Bonifacio Day
 December 25 – Christmas Day
 December 30 – Rizal Day
 December 31 – Last Day of the Year

In addition, several other places observe local holidays, such as the foundation of their town. These are also "special days."

Television

Births 
 January 9 – Fely Irvine, Australian entertainer of half-Filipino and half-Scottish ancestry
 January 12 – Arci Muñoz, actress, commercial model and lead singer of the band 'Philia'
 January 21 – Miguel Luis Villafuerte, politician and model
 January 22:
 Rich Asuncion, actress
 RJ Padilla, actor
 January 24 – Chris Banchero, basketball player
 January 25 – Yasmien Kurdi, actress, singer and mother
 January 29 – Dawn Chang, actress and member of Girltrends
 February 3 – Fhrancis Lopez, actor and model
 February 5 – Cristine Reyes, Filipina actress
 February 7 – Wendy Tabusalla, actress
 February 11:
 Kaye Cal, singer-songwriter
 Lovi Poe, actress and singer
 February 12 – Ram Revilla, actor (d. 2011)
 February 14 – Paul Lee, basketball player
 March 3 – Sef Cadayona, actor
 March 7 – Gerald Anderson, Filipino-American actor
 March 31 – Benjamin Alves, actor
 April 1 – Hasna Cabral, actress
 April 2 – Danita Paner, Filipina singer and actress
 April 6 – Geje Eustaquio, mixed martial artist and former MMA World Champion
 April 12:
 Dominic Roco, actor
 Felix Roco, actor
 April 26 – Nikko Ramos, filipino DJ of Magic 89.9 and presenter basketball of UAAP on ABS-CBN Sports and Action of ABS-CBN Sports. 
 May 2 – Monica Verallo, TV host journalist news anchor 
 May 15 – Stephan Palla, football player
 May 17 – Kris Bernal, actress
 June 8 – Tomas Trigo, football player
 June 12 – Krista Kleiner, Filipina-American beauty queen, singer, model, actress and martial artist
 June 17 – Vico Sotto, Mayor of Pasig
 July 2 – Emman Monfort, basketball player
 July 7 – JP Erram, basketball player
 July 12 – Xian Lim, Chinese-Filipino actor
 July 13:
 Justin Chua, basketball player
 Mary Joy Tabal, marathon runner
 July 16 – Samantha Nierras, football player
 July 20 – Rayver Cruz, actor and dancer
 July 26 – Janelle Quintana, actress
 August 2 – Raymond Almazan, basketball player
 August 18 – Nikki Bacolod, actress and singer
 August 21 – Tina Marasigan, news anchor
 August 22 – Chariz Solomon, actress
 September 21 – Jef Gaitan, actress
 September 24 – Pia Wurtzbach, Miss Universe 2015
 September 25 – Honorio Banario, mixed martial artist and former MMA World Champion
 September 27 – Robi Domingo, actor
 October 2 – Janine Gutierrez, Cebuano-Filipina actress, television host and commercial model.
 October 18 – Sarah Elago, activist and politician
 October 19 – Janine Tugonon, Miss Universe 2012, 1st runner–up
 October 30 – Ryan Arabejo, swimmer
 November 6 – Shaina Magdayao, actress
 November 12 – Gino M. Santos, director and producer
 November 15 – Jona, singer
 November 17 – June Mar Fajardo, basketball player
 November 21 – Ejay Falcon, actor and Vice Governor of Oriental Mindoro
 November 22:
 Eduardo Castillo, actor
 Valerie Weigmann, actress and TV host
 November 26 – Angeline Quinto, actress and singer
 November 30 – LA Revilla, basketball player
 December 11 – Sam Pinto, actress
 December 15 – Cora Waddell, actress 
 December 18 – Cindy Miranda, actress
 December 26 – Jennica Garcia, actress
 December 28 – Jill Yulo, actress
 December 30 – Sabrina, singer

Deaths

 January 27 – Bayani Casimiro, Sr., Filipino dancer (b. 1918)
 April 21 – James N. Rowe, United States Army officer (b. 1938)
 August 19 – Alfredo Montelibano Sr., politician and industrialist (b. 1905)
 September 28 – Ferdinand Marcos, President of the Philippines (b. 1917)
 December 1 – Danilo Atienza, pilot (b. 1951)

References